Mercury – Acts 1 & 2 is the sixth studio album by American pop rock band Imagine Dragons, released through Kidinakorner and Interscope Records. It is a double album consisting of 32 tracks, with the first half, Mercury – Act 1, released on September 3, 2021, and Mercury – Act 2, the second half, released on July 1, 2022, as part of Mercury – Acts 1 & 2. The album was executive produced by Rick Rubin.

Background and concept 
Imagine Dragons released their fifth studio album Mercury – Act 1 on September 3, 2021. Upon its release, the band confirmed that they would be releasing a sequel album. The band stated that Rick Rubin would executive produce the album. In January 2022, frontman Dan Reynolds claimed the album was "almost done" and would likely be released following the first leg of the Mercury Tour. In an interview released through Apple Music in late March, Reynolds stated that the album was different sonically than their previous albums and said it was influenced by hip hop.

Reynolds, in an interview with Consequence, described the creative process behind the two albums:

Singles and promotion 
"Bones" was released as the lead single to Mercury – Act 2 on March 11, 2022.  The song was used to promote the upcoming third season of the Amazon Prime Video series The Boys.  The release of the song's music video on April 6 coincided with the pre-order of the album. 

The album's second single, "Sharks", was released on June 24, 2022, along with an accompanying music video. It was sent to Italian radio on July 1, 2022. 

The third single for the album, "I Don't Like Myself", was released on October 10, 2022, along with an accompanying music video for World Mental Health Day. For the occasion, the band partnered with Crisis Text Line for a fundraising campaign.

"Symphony" was sent to radio in Italy on November 25, 2022 as the fourth single from the album.

Critical reception 

Neil Z. Yeung of AllMusic was critical of Act 2s unfocused nature and length, stating, "There's simply too much going on and not enough editorial trimming to make this as impactful an experience as Act 1." 

Reviewing Act 2, Ali Shutler of The Telegraph was unenthusiastic of the more downtempo songs, claiming they "all trudge towards the same big, emotional finale that’s less impactful every time and quickly sucks the joy from the record. Shutler also deemed it forgettable, stating, "In a bid to appeal to everyone, the band have removed anything that would make them stand out. There’s no doubt you’ll hear Imagine Dragons’ music everywhere over the next few months, but you’ll be hard pushed to remember it."

Track listing 

Notes

 The originally released standard version of Mercury – Act 1 does not include "Enemy". The song was added onto the album as an additional track on digital retailers and streaming platforms.
 "I Wish" appears as a bonus track on digital, streaming, and Target Exclusive CD versions of Mercury – Acts 1 & 2, but is omitted from the standard physical version.
 The Japanese edition of Mercury – Act 1 features the bonus track "Follow You (Summer '21 Version)", produced by Brandon Darner.
 The Japanese edition of Mercury – Acts 1 & 2 features acoustic versions of "Believer" and "Follow You", a live rendition of "Wrecked" (dubbed 'From The Bunker'), a solo mix of "Enemy" with a new verse from Dan Reynolds instead of JID, and a live rendition of "Bones" performed at the Climate Pledge Arena.

Charts

Weekly charts

Year-end charts

Certifications

Release history

References 

2022 albums
Imagine Dragons albums
Kidinakorner albums
Interscope Records albums
Albums produced by Rick Rubin
Albums produced by Mattman & Robin
Sequel albums